WSUB-LP (96.7 FM) is a radio station licensed to the community of Ashaway, Rhode Island. It serves the greater Westerly, Rhode Island, region as well as part of southern Rhode Island and southeastern Connecticut. The station is owned by The Buzz Alternative Radio Foundation, Inc., headed by Jaime DiPaola. The station is managed by Christopher DiPaola. Its Vice President is Steve Conti, Assistant GM is Lana Weidner Program Director is Lorren Kleinkauf. Local on air staff are on daily with local syndicated night host Johnny Mac  It airs an alternative rock format.

The station has been assigned the WSUB-LP call letters by the Federal Communications Commission since February 9, 2011, and its nickname is "96.7 The Buzz."

History 
On February 7, 2004, this low-power FM station first signed on as WCTD-LP at 96.9 FM. The station aired an "all-disco all-the-time" music format. Branded as "96.9 The Party", the station's slogan was "You're always invited to our party." At sign-on, the station could be heard in parts of southwestern Rhode Island and southeastern Connecticut. When it signed on, this station was the only 24-hour disco station in the Northeastern United States.

In December 2005, WCTD-LP changed call letters to WBLQ-LP after sister station WBLQ switched to WKIV as part of its three-year LMA arrangement with the "K-Love" station group.

In March 2006, the station was granted a change in frequency from 96.9 MHz to 96.7 MHz to reduce interference caused by the then-recent move of WHBE (now WEHN) in East Hampton, New York, from 96.7 MHz to 96.9 MHz.

Move to 1230 AM 
In May 2007, Rhode Island Public Broadcasting reached an agreement to sell WXNI to Chris DiPaola's Diponti Communications for a reported $350,000. The AM station will also switch to the WBLQ call sign.  In December 2007, Diponti Communications filed for transfer of the WXNI license. Owner Chris DiPaola told NorthEast Radio Watch that once the transfer is complete that the programming  aired on WBLQ-LP moved to the more powerful AM signal and the LPFM had flipped to a contemporary Christian format with the call letters WYCM-LP, "Your Christian Mix" with the assistance of the folks at WYCM in Charlton, Massachusetts. After Steven Binley and WYCM decided to focus on his Worcester, Massachusetts radio station, 96.7 changed call letters and format once again. 96.7 changed its call sign to WRBZ-LP with an alternative rock format and the moniker, "96.7 The Buzz."   Chris DiPaola was also an officer and director of Southern Rhode Island Public Radio Broadcasting, which owned WKIV, purchased from that corporation by Educational Media Foundation in March 2008, also in Westerly.

WBLQ-LP changed its call sign to WYCM-LP on November 26, 2009. WYCM-LP changed its call sign to WRBZ-LP on November 24, 2010. WRBZ-LP changed its call sign to WSUB-LP on February 9, 2011. WXNI switched to WBLQ on November 29, 2009, soon after the sale of WXNI closed.

See also
List of community radio stations in the United States

References

External links 
 
 
 

SUB-LP
Community radio stations in the United States
SUB-LP
Hopkinton, Rhode Island
Radio stations established in 2004
Alternative rock radio stations in the United States